Group M of the 2017 Africa Cup of Nations qualification tournament was one of the thirteen groups to decide the teams which qualified for the 2017 Africa Cup of Nations finals tournament. The group consisted of four teams: Cameroon, South Africa, Gambia, and Mauritania.

The teams played against each other home-and-away in a round-robin format, between June 2015 and September 2016.

Cameroon, the group winners, qualified for the 2017 Africa Cup of Nations.

Standings

Matches

Goalscorers
3 goals

 Cheikh Moulaye Ahmed
 Thamsanqa Gabuza

2 goals

 Vincent Aboubakar
 Keagan Dolly
 Hlompho Kekana

1 goal

 Karl Toko Ekambi
 Benjamin Moukandjo
 Nicolas Nkoulou
 Edgar Salli
 Sébastien Siani
 Mustapha Carayol
 Aly Abeid
 Boubacar Bagili
 Diallo Guidileye
 Tokelo Rantie

Notes

References

External links
Orange Africa Cup Of Nations Qualifiers 2017, CAFonline.com

Group M